Hapithinae is a subfamily of insects in the cricket family Gryllidae. It is one of several groups referred to in American English as "bush crickets" (along with Eneopterinae and Trigonidiinae), although this term can be confused with the Tettigoniidae.

Taxonomy
The Orthoptera Species File lists three tribes:

Aphonomorphini 
Auth.: Desutter-Grandcolas, 1988 (Central & S. America, SE Asia)
 Aenigmaphonus Gorochov, 2010 c g
 Aphonomorphus Rehn, 1903 c g
 Eneopteroides Gorochov, 2010 c g
 Idiotrella Desutter-Grandcolas, 2017 c g
 Paraphonus Otte & Perez-Gelabert, 2009 c g
 Spiraphonus Otte & Perez-Gelabert, 2009 c g

Cearacesaini 
Auth.: Koçak & Kemal, 2010 (South America)
 Barota Chopard, 1956 c g
 Cearacesa Hebard, 1928 c g
 Najtaecesa Uhler, 1864 i c g b (flightless bush crickets)
 Taroba Saussure, 1878 c g

Hapithini 

Auth.: Gorochov, 1986  (Central & S. America)
 Carylla Gorochov, 2002 c g
 Gryllophyllus Gorochov, 2017 c g
 Hapithus Uhler, 1864 - Flightless Bush Crickets
 subgenus Antillicharis Otte & Perez-Gelabert, 2009
 subgenus Curiocharis Gorochov, 2017
 subgenus Hapithus Uhler, 1864
 subgenus Laurepa Walker, 1869
 subgenus Mashiyana Otte & Perez-Gelabert, 2009
 subgenus Orocharis Uhler, 1864
 Knyella de Mello & Souza-Dias, 2010 c g
 Laurellia Otte & Perez-Gelabert, 2009 c g
 Margarettia Gorochov, 2017 c g
 Phyllogryllus Otte & Perez-Gelabert, 2009 c g
 Sabelo Otte & Perez-Gelabert, 2009 c g
 Sipho Saussure, 1878 c g
 Somnambula Otte & Perez-Gelabert, 2009 c g
 Stenogryllus Gorochov, 2017 c g
 Walkerana Otte & Perez-Gelabert, 2009 c g

Tribe not assigned 
 Hapithoides - monotypic H.  insolitum Hebard, 1928 c g (S. America)
Data sources: i = ITIS, c = Catalogue of Life, g = GBIF, b = Bugguide.net

References

 
Orthoptera subfamilies